

528001–528100 

|-bgcolor=#f2f2f2
| colspan=4 align=center | 
|}

528101–528200 

|-bgcolor=#f2f2f2
| colspan=4 align=center | 
|}

528201–528300 

|-bgcolor=#f2f2f2
| colspan=4 align=center | 
|}

528301–528400 

|-bgcolor=#f2f2f2
| colspan=4 align=center | 
|}

528401–528500 

|-bgcolor=#f2f2f2
| colspan=4 align=center | 
|}

528501–528600 

|-bgcolor=#f2f2f2
| colspan=4 align=center | 
|}

528601–528700 

|-bgcolor=#f2f2f2
| colspan=4 align=center | 
|}

528701–528800 

|-bgcolor=#f2f2f2
| colspan=4 align=center | 
|}

528801–528900 

|-bgcolor=#f2f2f2
| colspan=4 align=center | 
|}

528901–529000 

|-id=997
| 528997 Tanakatakenori ||  || Tanaka Takenori (born 1941) is an Honored Sensei of the Japan Shotokai Karate Federation and Honorary President of the Russian Shotokai Karate Federation. || 
|}

References 

528001-529000